Doctor Manuel Belgrano is a department of Jujuy Province, Argentina.

References

External links

Departments of Jujuy Province